

Participants
U16 teams of AFC Ajax, FC Porto, Manchester City, Vasco da Gama were invited to play in the 24th Canon Lion City Cup in 2012. The hosts, Singapore sent in two teams: National Football Academy 15 and National Football Academy 16. The Tournament is sponsored by Canon.

Results
Fixtures and results of the Canon Lion City Cup 2012.

Group stage

Group A

Group B

Semi-finals

5th Placing Play Off

3rd Placing Play Off

Finals

Football in Singapore
2012 in Singaporean football